Borovany is a town in České Budějovice District in the South Bohemian Region of the Czech Republic. It has about 4,100 inhabitants. Trocnov, today a part of Borovany, is known as the birthplace of one of the most notable people of Czech history, general Jan Žižka.

Administrative parts
Villages of Vrcov, Hluboká u Borovan, Dvorec, Třebeč, Radostice and Trocnov are administrative parts of Borovany.

Geography
It lies in the Gratzen Foothills. The Stropnice River flows through the territory. The area is rich in ponds.

History
The first written mention of Borovany is from 1186. In 1455, the Borovany Monastery was founded.

In the 19th century, the development of the village occurred with the construction of the České Budějovice–Vienna railway, which was completed in 1869, and with the discovery of diatomaceous earth deposits at the end of the century. It began to be intensively mined and processed for the construction industry after the World War I. Another plant was constructed after World War II and the third one in the 1970. In 1973, Borovany received the status of a town.

Demographics

Sights

The Borovany Castle was built in the Baroque style in 1760–1770. It was originally part of the monastery, but the monastery was abolished in 1785, and the Schwarzenberg family bought the building and used it as a castle. The Schwarzenbergs owned it until 1939, when it was purchased by the town, which established a museum there.

Next to the castle is the Church of the Visitation of the Virgin Mary. It was built between the 1470s and 1490s. It was built in the late Gothic style, atypical for this region. The rectory next to the church was built together with the castle and is connected with it.

Trocnov is known as the birthplace of one of the most notable people of Czech history, general Jan Žižka. The site where the original Trocnov hamlet was located consists of foundations of the original buildings, Jan Žižka Monument, Jan Žižka Memorial, and monument at the place of Žižka's birth. The locality is protected as a national cultural monument.

In Dvorec is the Dvorec Zoo, one of the smallest zoos in the country. It keeps 120 species of animals.

Notable people
Jan Žižka (c. 1360–1424), general
Tomáš Verner (born 1986), figure skater; lived here

Gallery

References

External links

Official tourist portal

Cities and towns in the Czech Republic
Populated places in České Budějovice District